Josy Poueyto (born 13 January 1954) is a French politician representing the Democratic Movement. She was elected to the French National Assembly on 18 June 2017, representing the 1st constituency of the department of Pyrénées-Atlantiques.

References

1954 births
Living people
Deputies of the 15th National Assembly of the French Fifth Republic
Women members of the National Assembly (France)
Democratic Movement (France) politicians
21st-century French women politicians
Deputies of the 16th National Assembly of the French Fifth Republic
Members of Parliament for Pyrénées-Atlantiques